The 1970–71 Northern Premier League was the third season of the Northern Premier League, a regional football league in Northern England, the northern areas of the Midlands and North Wales. The season began on 15 August 1970 and concluded on 8 May 1971.

Overview
The League was expanded this season, for the first time, from twenty teams to twenty-two teams.

Team changes
The following two clubs left the League at the end of the previous season:
Hyde United resigned, demoted to Cheshire County League
Gateshead relegated to Wearside Football League

The following four clubs joined the League at the start of the season:
Bradford Park Avenue relegated from Football League Fourth Division.
Chorley promoted from Lancashire Combination (returning after a year's absence)
Kirkby Town promoted from Lancashire Combination
Lancaster City promoted from Lancashire Combination

League table

Results

Stadia and locations

Cup results

Challenge Cup

FA Cup

Out of the twenty-two clubs from the Northern Premier League, only Wigan Athletic reached for the second round:

Second Round

Third Round

FA Trophy

Out of the twenty-two clubs from the Northern Premier League, only Macclesfield Town reached for the fourth round:

Fourth Round

End of the season
At the end of the third season of the Northern Premier League none of the teams put forward, for election, received enough votes to be promoted to the Football League. Conversely, none of the sides were relegated.

Football League elections
Alongside the four Football League clubs facing re-election, a total of twelve non-League clubs applied for election, three of which were from the Northern Premier League. All four Football League teams were re-elected.

Promotion and relegation
The League expanding from twenty-two clubs to twenty-four clubs for the following season.

The following two clubs joined the League the following season:
Skelmersdale United promoted from Cheshire County League
Ellesmere Port Town promoted from Cheshire County League.

References

External links
 Northern Premier League official website
 Northern Premier League tables at RSSSF
 Football Club History Database

Northern Premier League seasons
5